Mahidol usually refers to Prince Mahidol Adulyadej of Songkla, father of King Bhumibol Adulyadej of Thailand. The name may also refer to:
Mahidol as the surname used by members of Prince Mahidol's line of the Thai royal family
Mahidol University, a university in Bangkok, Thailand